David H. Marks is an American engineer, focusing in sustainable development, currently the Goulder Professor of Civil and Environmental Engineering and Engineering Systems, Emeritus at Massachusetts Institute of Technology.

References

Year of birth missing (living people)
Living people
MIT School of Engineering faculty
21st-century American engineers